The Rupert River is one of the largest rivers in Quebec, Canada.

There is some extremely large whitewater on the river, but paddlers can avoid much of it by portage routes on the side.  The most impressive falls, which cannot be avoided except by portaging, are the "Oatmeal Rapids" right at the James Bay Road (a set of cascades dropping ) and "The Fours" near the end of the river (a  drop).

The Rupert has long been an important river for the Cree of the area. Every year, a group of Cree youth from the village of Waskaganish, at the mouth of the Rupert, travel up the river to Lake Nemiscau.

Major tributaries of the Rupert are (in downstream order):
 Natastan River (Rivière Natastan)
 Lemare River (Rivière Lemare) -  subbasin
 Marten River (Rivière à la Marte) -  subbasin
 Nemiscau River (Rivière Nemiscau) -  subbasin

History

In 1668, an expedition led by Médard des Groseilliers came to the mouth of the Rupert River in order to bypass French controlled areas along the St. Lawrence River and in doing so, trying to break the French hold on the fur trade. They named the river after the sponsor of the expedition, Prince Rupert. A fort (originally called Fort Charles) was established at the mouth of the river, which later became the trading post Rupert House, the oldest trading post of the Hudson's Bay Company. From then on, the Rupert River played a vital role in supplying inland trading posts (such as Nemiscau and Mistissini) with regular canoe brigades, right until the beginning of the twentieth century when supplies started to come from the south via rail and later road.

While having lost its importance as a trade route, the Rupert River has long been a popular destination for recreational canoe camping and whitewater canoeing.

Hydroelectric development

The Rupert, together with the Nottaway and Broadback rivers, was initially considered to be dammed and diverted as part of the James Bay Project. But in 1972, hydro-electric development began on the more northerly La Grande and Eastmain rivers, and the NBR Project was shelved.

The plan to divert the Rupert's headwaters into the La Grande hydroelectric complex was revived in 2002 when a landmark agreement between the Government of Quebec and the Grand Council of the Crees was signed. In this agreement, known as La Paix des braves (literally "Peace of the Brave"), the two parties agreed to authorize the completion of a long-delayed hydroelectric project on the Eastmain River, just to the north of the Rupert River. A subsequent agreement in April 2004 put an end to all litigation between the two parties and opening the way to the joint environmental assessment of the diversion of about 50% of the total water flow of the Rupert River (and 70% at the diversion point) northwards to the Eastmain River and into the La Grande hydroelectric watershed. The Grand Chief of the Crees, Matthew Mukash , elected in late 2005, opposed the Rupert diversion project, preferring the development of wind turbines in the region.

After completion of the joint environmental assessments by the Cree, Quebec and Canadian authorities, the governments of Quebec and Canada authorized the diversion and construction of hydroelectric installations on the Rupert River in late 2006. The remaining work was complete in 2012.

Image gallery

See also
 List of longest rivers of Canada
 Royal eponyms in Canada
 List of rivers of Quebec

References

External links

The Rupert River website
The James Bay Road website - the James Bay region of Quebec
Save the Rupert
Rupert Reverence
The Rupert Hydroelectric Diversion (Hydro-Québec)
Environmental assessment process and documents (Ministry of the Environment of Québec) (fr)
Environmental assessment process and documents (Canadian Environmental Assessment Agency)
"Hydro-Electric Project to Reshape Wilderness" July 14, 2008 NPR radio report
Rezmutt's Flickr.com Rupert River Archive
The Rupert River (YouTube Video)

Rivers of Nord-du-Québec
James Bay Project
Tributaries of James Bay
Eeyou Istchee (territory)